The Obsidian Chamber is a thriller novel by Douglas Preston and Lincoln Child. The book was released on October 18, 2016 by Grand Central Publishing and is the sixteenth book in the Special Agent Pendergast series.

References

External links

American thriller novels
Novels by Douglas Preston
Novels by Lincoln Child
Collaborative novels
Sequel novels
2016 American novels
Grand Central Publishing books